The Cabinet of the United States is a body consisting of the vice president of the United States and the heads of the executive branch's departments in the federal government of the United States. It is the principal official advisory body to the president of the United States. The president chairs the meetings but is not formally a member of the Cabinet. The heads of departments, appointed by the president and confirmed by the Senate, are members of the Cabinet, and acting department heads also participate in Cabinet meetings whether or not they have been officially nominated for Senate confirmation. The president may designate heads of other agencies and non-Senate-confirmed members of the Executive Office of the President as members of the Cabinet.

The Cabinet does not have any collective executive powers or functions of its own, and no votes need to be taken. There are 24 members (25 including the vice president): 15 department heads and nine Cabinet-level members, all of whom, except two, had received Senate confirmation. The Cabinet meets with the president in a room adjacent to the Oval Office. The members sit in the order in which their respective department was created, with the earliest being closest to the president and the newest farthest away.

The members of the Cabinet serve at the pleasure of the president, who can dismiss them at any time without the approval of the Senate, as affirmed by the Supreme Court of the United States in Myers v. United States (1926) or downgrade their Cabinet membership status. Often it is legally possible for a Cabinet member to exercise certain powers over his or her own department against the president's wishes, but in practice this is highly unusual due to the threat of dismissal. The president also has the authority to organize the Cabinet, such as instituting committees. Like all federal public officials, Cabinet members are also subject to impeachment by the House of Representatives and trial in the Senate for "treason, bribery, or other high crimes and misdemeanors".

The Constitution of the United States does not explicitly establish a Cabinet. The Cabinet's role, inferred from the language of the Opinion Clause (ArticleII, Section2, Clause1) of the Constitution is to provide advice to the president. Additionally, the Twenty-fifth Amendment authorizes the vice president, together with a majority of the heads of the executive departments, to declare the president "unable to discharge the powers and duties of his office". The heads of the executive departments are—if eligible—in the presidential line of succession.

History

The tradition of the Cabinet arose out of the debates at the 1787 Constitutional Convention regarding whether the president would exercise executive authority solely or collaboratively with a cabinet of ministers or a privy council. As a result of the debates, the Constitution (ArticleII, Section1, Clause1) vests "all executive power" in the president singly, and authorizes—but does not compel—the president (ArticleII, Section2, Clause1) to "require the Opinion, in writing, of the principal Officer in each of the executive Departments, upon any Subject relating to the Duties of their respective Offices". The Constitution does not specify what the executive departments will be, how many there will be, or what their duties will be.

George Washington, the first president of the United States, organized his principal officers into a Cabinet, and it has been part of the executive branch structure ever since. Washington's Cabinet consisted of five members: himself, Secretary of State Thomas Jefferson, Secretary of the Treasury Alexander Hamilton, Secretary of War Henry Knox and Attorney General Edmund Randolph. Vice President John Adams was not included in Washington's Cabinet because the position was initially regarded as a legislative officer (president of the Senate). Furthermore, until there was a vacancy in the presidency (which did not occur until the death of William Henry Harrison in 1841) it was not certain that a vice president would be allowed to serve as president for the duration of the original term as opposed to merely acting as president until new elections could be held. It was not until the 20th century that vice presidents were regularly included as members of the Cabinet and came to be regarded primarily as a member of the executive branch.

Presidents have used Cabinet meetings of selected principal officers but to widely differing extents and for different purposes. During President Abraham Lincoln's administration, Secretary of State William H. Seward advocated the use of a parliamentary-style Cabinet government. However, Lincoln rebuffed Seward. While a professor Woodrow Wilson also advocated a parliamentary-style Cabinet, but after becoming president did not implement it in his administration. In recent administrations, Cabinets have grown to include key White House staff in addition to department and various agency heads. President Ronald Reagan formed seven sub-cabinet councils to review many policy issues, and subsequent presidents have followed that practice.

Federal law
In  with regard to delegation of authority by the president, it is provided that "nothing herein shall be deemed to require express authorization in any case in which such an official would be presumed in law to have acted by authority or direction of the president." This pertains directly to the heads of the executive departments as each of their offices is created and specified by statutory law (hence the presumption) and thus gives them the authority to act for the president within their areas of responsibility without any specific delegation.

Under  (also known as the 1967 Federal Anti-Nepotism statute), federal officials are prohibited from appointing their immediate family members to certain governmental positions, including those in the Cabinet.

Under the Federal Vacancies Reform Act of 1998, an administration may appoint acting heads of department from employees of the relevant department. These may be existing high-level career employees, from political appointees of the outgoing administration (for new administrations), or sometimes lower-level appointees of the administration.

Confirmation process

The heads of the executive departments and all other federal agency heads are nominated by the president and then presented to the Senate for confirmation or rejection by a simple majority (although before the use of the "nuclear option" during the 113th United States Congress, they could have been blocked by filibuster, requiring cloture to be invoked by  supermajority to further consideration). If approved, they receive their commission scroll, are sworn in, and begin their duties. When the Senate is not in session, the president can appoint acting heads of the executive departments, and do so at the beginning of their term.

An elected vice president does not require Senate confirmation, nor does the White House chief of staff, which is an appointed staff position of the Executive Office of the President.

Salary

The heads of the executive departments and most other senior federal officers at cabinet or sub-cabinet level receive their salary under a fixed five-level pay plan known as the Executive Schedule, which is codified in Title 5 of the United States Code. , the LevelI annual pay was set at $235,600.

The annual salary of the vice president is $235,300. The salary level was set by the Government Salary Reform Act of 1989, which provides an automatic cost of living adjustment for federal employees. The vice president receives the same pension as other members of Congress based on their ex officio position as the president of the Senate.

Current Cabinet and Cabinet-rank officials

The individuals listed below were nominated by President Joe Biden to form his Cabinet and were confirmed by the United States Senate on the date noted or are serving as acting department heads by his request, pending the confirmation of his nominees.

Vice president and the heads of the executive departments

The Cabinet permanently includes the vice president and the heads of 15 executive departments, listed here according to their order of succession to the presidency. The speaker of the House and the president pro tempore of the Senate follow the vice president and precede the secretary of state in the order of succession, but both are in the legislative branch and are not part of the Cabinet.

Cabinet-level officials
The president may designate additional positions to be members of the Cabinet, which can vary under each president. They are not in the line of succession and are not necessarily officers of the United States.

Former executive and Cabinet-level departments
 Department of War (1789–1947), headed by the secretary of war: renamed Department of the Army by the National Security Act of 1947.
 Department of the Navy (1798–1949), headed by the secretary of the Navy: became a military department within the Department of Defense.
 Post Office Department (1829–1971), headed by the postmaster general: reorganized as the United States Postal Service, an independent agency.
 National Military Establishment (1947–1949), headed by the secretary of Defense: created by the National Security Act of 1947 and recreated as the Department of Defense in 1949.
 Department of the Army (1947–1949), headed by the secretary of the Army: became a military department within the Department of Defense.
 Department of the Air Force (1947–1949), headed by the secretary of the Air Force: became a military department within the Department of Defense.

Renamed heads of the executive departments
 Secretary of Foreign Affairs: created in July 1781 and renamed Secretary of State in September 1789.
 Secretary of War: created in 1789 and was renamed as Secretary of the Army by the National Security Act of 1947. The 1949 Amendments to the National Security Act of 1947 made the secretary of the Army a subordinate to the secretary of defense.
 Secretary of Commerce and Labor: created in 1903 and renamed Secretary of Commerce in 1913 when its labor functions were transferred to the new secretary of labor.
 Secretary of Health, Education, and Welfare: created in 1953 and renamed Secretary of Health and Human Services in 1979 when its education functions were transferred to the new secretary of education.

Positions intermittently elevated to Cabinet-rank
 Ambassador to the United Nations (1953–1989, 1993–2001, 2009–2018, 2021–present)
 Director of the Office of Management and Budget (1953–1961, 1969–present)
 White House Chief of Staff (1953–1961, 1974–1977, 1993–present)
 Counselor to the President (1969–1977, 1981–1985, 1992–1993): A title used by high-ranking political advisers to the president of the United States and senior members of the Executive Office of the President since the Nixon administration. Incumbents with Cabinet rank included Daniel Patrick Moynihan, Donald Rumsfeld and Anne Armstrong.
 White House Counsel (1974–1977)
 United States Trade Representative (1975–present)
 Chair of the Council of Economic Advisers (1977–1981, 1993–2001, 2009–2017, 2021–present)
 National Security Advisor (1977–1981)
 Director of Central Intelligence (1981–1989, 1995–2001)
 Administrator of the Environmental Protection Agency (1993–present)
 Director of the Office of National Drug Control Policy (1993–2009)
 Administrator of the Small Business Administration (1994–2001, 2012–present)
 Director of the Federal Emergency Management Agency (1996–2001): Created as an independent agency in 1979, raised to Cabinet rank in 1996, and dropped from Cabinet rank in 2001.
 Director of National Intelligence (2017–present)
 Director of the Central Intelligence Agency (2017–2021)
 Director of the Office of Science and Technology Policy (2021–present)

Proposed Cabinet departments

 Department of Industry and Commerce, proposed by Secretary of the Treasury William Windom in a speech given at a Chamber of Commerce dinner in May 1881.
 Department of Natural Resources, proposed by the Eisenhower administration, President Richard Nixon, the 1976 GOP national platform, and by Bill Daley (as a consolidation of the Departments of the Interior and Energy, and the Environmental Protection Agency).
 Department of Peace, proposed by Senator Matthew Neely in the 1930s, Congressman Dennis Kucinich, 2020 presidential candidate Marianne Williamson, and other members of the U.S. Congress.
 Department of Social Welfare, proposed by President Franklin Roosevelt in January 1937.
 Department of Public Works, proposed by President Franklin Roosevelt in January 1937.
 Department of Conservation (renamed Department of the Interior), proposed by President Franklin Roosevelt in January 1937.
 Department of Urban Affairs and Housing, proposed by President John F. Kennedy.
 Department of Business and Labor, proposed by President Lyndon Johnson.
 Department of Community Development, proposed by President Richard Nixon; to be chiefly concerned with rural infrastructure development.
 Department of Human Resources, proposed by President Richard Nixon; essentially a revised Department of Health, Education, and Welfare.
 Department of Economic Affairs, proposed by President Richard Nixon; essentially a consolidation of the Departments of Commerce, Labor, and Agriculture.
 Department of Environmental Protection, proposed by Senator Arlen Specter and others.
 Department of Intelligence, proposed by former Director of National Intelligence Mike McConnell.
 Department of Global Development, proposed by the Center for Global Development.
 Department of Art, proposed by Quincy Jones.
 Department of Business, proposed by President Barack Obama as a consolidation of the U.S. Department of Commerce's core business and trade functions, the Small Business Administration, the Office of the U.S. Trade Representative, the Export-Import Bank, the Overseas Private Investment Corporation, and the U.S. Trade and Development Agency.
 Department of Education and the Workforce, proposed by President Donald Trump as a consolidation of the Departments of Education and Labor.
 Department of Health and Public Welfare, proposed by President Donald Trump as a renamed Department of Health and Human Services.
 Department of Economic Development, proposed by Senator Elizabeth Warren to replace the Commerce Department, subsume other agencies like the Small Business Administration and the Patent and Trademark Office, and include research and development programs, worker training programs, and export and trade authorities like the Office of the U.S. Trade Representative with the single goal of creating and protecting American jobs.
 Department of Technology, proposed by businessman and 2020 Democratic presidential candidate Andrew Yang.
 Department of Culture, patterned on similar departments in many foreign nations, proposed by, among others, Murray Moss and Jeva Lange.

See also
 Black Cabinet
 Brain trust
 Cabinet of Joe Biden
 Cabinet of the Confederate States of America
 Kitchen Cabinet
 List of African-American United States Cabinet members
 List of Hispanic and Latino American United States Cabinet members
 List of female United States Cabinet members
 List of foreign-born United States Cabinet members
 List of people who have held multiple United States Cabinet-level positions
 List of United States Cabinet members who have served more than eight years
 List of United States political appointments that crossed party lines
 St. Wapniacl (historical mnemonic acronym)
 Unsuccessful nominations to the Cabinet of the United States

References

Further reading
 Bennett, Anthony. The American President's Cabinet. Houndmills, Basingstoke, Hampshire: Macmillan, 1996. . A study of the U.S. Cabinet from Kennedy to Clinton.
 Grossman, Mark. Encyclopedia of the United States Cabinet (Santa Barbara, California: ABC-CLIO; three volumes, 2000; reprint, New York: Greyhouse Publishing; two volumes, 2010). A history of the United States and Confederate States Cabinets, their secretaries, and their departments.
 Rudalevige, Andrew. "The President and the Cabinet", in Michael Nelson, ed., The Presidency and the Political System, 8th ed. (Washington, D.C.: CQ Press, 2006).

External links

 Official site of the President's Cabinet
 U.S. Senate's list of Cabinet members who did not attend the State of the Union Address (since 1984)

 
United States